Der Herr der Ringe was a German language radio adaptation of J.R.R. Tolkien's The Lord of the Rings broadcast on the German radio stations Südwestrundfunk and Westdeutscher Rundfunk between September 1991 and March 1992. At thirty half-hour episodes, and a speaking cast of around 96 actors, it was a landmark achievement in German audio drama.

Episode list

Cast

Notes and references

External links
 Page about the Radio Series

Radio programmes based on Middle-earth
Fantasy radio programs
Works based on The Lord of the Rings